Sha'ar HaGai in Hebrew, and Bab al-Wad or Bab al-Wadi in Arabic (or ), lit. Gate of the Valley in both languages, is a point on the Tel Aviv-Jerusalem highway, 23 km from Jerusalem, where the road begins to ascend through a deep valley flanked by steep rocky slopes, of the intermittent stream  (Arabic: Wadi Ali).

Etymology
The Arabic name Bab al-Wad, 'Gate of the Valley', was used in Hebrew as well, as seen in the 1948 song, until after the establishment of the State of Israel and the creation of the Hebrew name, Sha'ar HaGai, a verbatim translation of the Arabic name.

History

Ottoman era

The Jaffa–Jerusalem road was initially made accessible for wheeled vehicles by the Ottomans in 1867 and since then served as the main highway to Jerusalem, favoured over more topographically convenient routes such as Route 443, known since biblical times as the "ascent of Beth-Horon". The journey from Jaffa to Jerusalem was reduced, thanks to this upgrade, from three to two days and Bab al-Wad became the one place where travellers had to stop for the night. For this purpose, the Ottomans built there an inn or caravansary, used soon after, in 1869, the year of the inauguration of the Suez Canal, by travelling royalty taking a detour to Jerusalem such as Franz Joseph I of Austria-Hungary, the future British king Edward VII and his brother-in-law the future German emperor Frederick III. In 1898 the site was used again by German emperor Wilhelm II and his wife Augusta Victoria, who slept there in a tent camp. The largest bell for the church of the Augusta Victoria Foundation, initiated by Wilhelm during his 1898 visit and built between 1907 and 1910, weighed six tonnes and required that the road be widened and paved.

After World War II, a Jerusalem-born Jew, Todor Warshavsky leased the khan and moved there with his family, offering travelers light meals and care of animals.

British Mandate

During the 1947–48 Civil War in Mandatory Palestine and into the 1948 Arab-Israeli War, this area and the nearby police fort at Latrun saw fierce fighting between Arab forces and Jewish convoys on the way to blockaded Jerusalem. Bab al-Wad and the defile it guards changed hands between the Arab Liberation Army supported by Arab irregulars, and Jewish Palmach and Haganah units, until April 20 1948, when the Arabs recaptured the heights around Bab al-Wad closing off the Tel Aviv-Jerusalem road.

Jordanian rule 
From mid-May 1948 on, the fort at Latrun, two kilometres west of Bab al-Wad, was held by the Arab Legion, the British-trained and commanded army of Transjordan. The Palmach's 10th (Harel) Brigade under the command of Lt. Col. Yitzhak Rabin, future prime minister of Israel, managed to capture Bab al-Wad itself, but the road section west of it, controlled from Latrun, remained in Jordanian hands until 1967, cutting off this main access route to Jerusalem. In order to bypass the Arab-held bottleneck, the Israelis constructed the Burma Road, named after the famous World War II road into China. This very steep bypass road was in use during the first, crucial part of the war, being replaced after six months by a longer but safer detour route.

State of Israel
After the 1967 Arab-Israeli War, when the Latrun area was captured by Israel, the main Tel Aviv–Jerusalem highway was once again constructed on the shortest route past Latrun and Sha'ar HaGai. Today's already four-lane wide Highway 1 is currently (2016) being widened due to increasing traffic, by further carving into the slopes of the Wadi Ali gorge.

Landmarks

Sandwich trucks
Until the 2000s, the remains of armoured cars that belonged to Jewish convoys and were destroyed during the 1948 war were lining the route as a memorial to the war dead. Most of them were regular trucks with improvised armour made of two sheets of steel and a layer of wood in between, which led to them being called "sandwich trucks". Then they had to be relocated by the army to the two extremities of the gorge, where they have been secured against scrap metal thieves, conserved and displayed on the side of the highway.

Mahal Memorial 

Memorial for Jerusalem corridor casualties
The 1967 work of Israeli sculptor Naomi Henrik is built of stainless steel and concrete and consists of a cluster of tubes resembling rockets that point towards Jerusalem.

Literary references
The battles of 1948 were commemorated by a Hebrew song, Bab al-Wad, with words by Haim Gouri and music by Shmuel Fershko. The song has been performed by numerous famous Israeli singers, such as Yafa Yarkoni, Shoshana Damari, Shlomo Gronich, and Harel Skaat. The song has four verses, with the fourth verse spoken before the final chorus.

Here I walk silently
And I remember them, every single one
Here we fought, together, over cliffs and boulders
Here we were to one family

Bab al Wad
Forever do remember our names
As convoys broke through to the city
On the roadsides lie our dead
The iron hulk as silent as my comrade

Israelis referring to the location in daily life call it by the Hebrew name Sha'ar HaGai (שער הגיא) in Hebrew, but the famous song calls it by the Arabic name Bab al-Wad - preserving the fact that in 1948, the soldiers of the young Israel called it that. Both the Hebrew and Arabic name mean the same - "Gate of the Valley".

Gallery

See also
Battle for Jerusalem (December 1947 - July 1948)
Jerusalem corridor, the wider area that contains Bab al-Wad/Sha'ar HaGai and the Wadi Ali gorge
Operation Ha-Har of the Israeli army in October 1948, leading to the IDF taking control of the Jerusalem corridor

References

External links

 Text of song in Romanized Hebrew, English, and Italian
 Detailed map of central Israel showing location
 Description of the location now, including photo

Regions of Israel
1948 Arab–Israeli War
 Jerusalem District